The 2019 Orléans Masters was a badminton tournament which took place at Palais des Sports in France from 19 to 24 March 2019 and had a total purse of $75,000.

Tournament
The 2019 Orléans Masters was the second Super 100 tournament of the 2019 BWF World Tour and also part of the Orléans Masters championships, which had been held since 2012. This tournament was organized by the Cercle Laïque des Tourelles Orléans (CLTO) Badminton and sanctioned by the BWF and Fédération Française de Badminton.

Venue
This international tournament was held at Palais des Sports in Orléans, Centre-Val de Loire, France.

Point distribution
Below is the point distribution table for each phase of the tournament based on the BWF points system for the BWF Tour Super 100 event.

Prize money
The total prize money for this tournament was US$75,000. Distribution of prize money was in accordance with BWF regulations.

Men's singles

Seeds

 Hans-Kristian Vittinghus (withdrew)
 Mark Caljouw (semi-finals)
 Yu Igarashi (third round)
 Lucas Corvée (second round)
 Victor Svendsen (withdrew)
 Parupalli Kashyap (third round)
 Toma Junior Popov (third round)
 Thomas Rouxel (final)

Finals

Top half

Section 1

Section 2

Bottom half

Section 3

Section 4

Women's singles

Seeds

 Kirsty Gilmour (final)
 Saena Kawakami (champion)
 Ayumi Mine (quarter-finals)
 Chloe Birch (first round)
 Neslihan Yiğit (semi-finals)
 Sabrina Jaquet (quarter-finals)
 Linda Zetchiri (second round)
 Qi Xuefei (quarter-finals)

Finals

Top half

Section 1

Section 2

Bottom half

Section 3

Section 4

Men's doubles

Seeds

 Marcus Ellis / Chris Langridge (first round)
 Mathias Boe / Carsten Mogensen (withdrew)
 Mark Lamsfuß / Marvin Emil Seidel (withdrew)
 Ben Lane / Sean Vendy (quarter-finals)
 Lee Yang / Wang Chi-lin (champions)
 Akira Koga / Taichi Saito (final)
 Thom Gicquel / Ronan Labar (second round)
 Hiroki Okamura / Masayuki Onodera (first round)

Finals

Top half

Section 1

Section 2

Bottom half

Section 3

Section 4

Women's doubles

Seeds

 Nami Matsuyama / Chiharu Shida (withdrew)
 Émilie Lefel / Anne Tran (quarter-finals)
 Delphine Delrue / Léa Palermo (quarter-finals)
 Yulfira Barkah / Jauza Fadhila Sugiarto (quarter-finals)
 Akane Araki / Riko Imai (second round)
 Chloe Birch / Lauren Smith (champions)
 Johanna Goliszewski / Lara Käpplein (first round)
 Agatha Imanuela / Siti Fadia Silva Ramadhanti (semi-finals)

Finals

Top half

Section 1

Section 2

Bottom half

Section 3

Section 4

Mixed doubles

Seeds

 Marcus Ellis / Lauren Smith (second round)
 Mark Lamsfuß / Isabel Herttrich (withdrew)
 Marvin Emil Seidel / Linda Efler (withdrew)
 Evgenij Dremin / Evgenia Dimova (quarter-finals)
 Ben Lane / Jessica Pugh (second round)
 Sam Magee / Chloe Magee (second round)
 Wang Chi-lin / Cheng Chi-ya (second round)
 Jacco Arends / Cheryl Seinen (first round)

Finals

Top half

Section 1

Section 2

Bottom half

Section 3

Section 4

References

External links
 Tournament Link
 Official Website

Orléans Masters
Orléans Masters
Orléans Masters
Orléans Masters